Gyula Vincze (27 January 1914 – 4 February 2002) was a Hungarian wrestler. He competed in the men's Greco-Roman welterweight at the 1936 Summer Olympics.

References

1914 births
2002 deaths
Hungarian male sport wrestlers
Olympic wrestlers of Hungary
Wrestlers at the 1936 Summer Olympics
Martial artists from Budapest